

Friedrich-Wilhelm von Chappuis (13 September 1886 – 27 August 1942) was a German general in the Wehrmacht during World War II who commanded the XXXVIII Army Corps. 

He was a recipient of the Knight's Cross of the Iron Cross of Nazi Germany. Chappuis was relieved of this post on 24 April 1942 and transferred to the Führerreserve. He committed suicide on 27 August 1942.

Awards 
 Knight's Cross of the Iron Cross on 15 August 1940 as generalleutnant and commander of 15th Infantry Division 
 Knight of Honour of the Order of St. John

References

Citations

Bibliography

 

1886 births
1942 deaths
People from Nakło County
People from the Province of Posen
German Army personnel of World War I
Prussian Army personnel
German military personnel who committed suicide
Recipients of the clasp to the Iron Cross, 1st class
Recipients of the Knight's Cross of the Iron Cross
Suicides by firearm in Germany
German Army generals of World War II
Generals of Infantry (Wehrmacht)
Reichswehr personnel
20th-century Freikorps personnel